Mount St. Piran is a mountain in Banff National Park near Lake Louise, Alberta, Canada.
  
Located in the Bow River Valley southeast of the Minewakun Lake Valley; northwest of Lake Agnes; between Lake Louise Valley and lower Bath Creek, Banff Park, Alberta.

It was named in 1894 by Samuel E.S. Allen after Saint Piran, the Patron Saint of Cornwall.

Nearby
 Elizabeth Parker hut
 Lake O'Hara
 Fairview Mountain
 Mount Niblock

Further reading
 Alan Kane, Scrambles in the Canadian Rockies – 3rd Edition, P 309
 Gerry Shea, The Aspiring Hiker's Guide 1: Mountain Treks in Alberta, PP 132 - 133
 Dave Birrell, 50 Roadside Panoramas in the Canadian Rockies, P 90
 Tony Daffern, Popular Day Hikes 2: Canadian Rockies

References

Canadian Rockies
Two-thousanders of Alberta
Mountains of Banff National Park